Volodymyr Musiyovych Chekhivsky (July 19, 1876 in Kyiv Governorate – November 3, 1937 in Sandarmokh) was a Ukrainian political and public activist, prime minister of the Ukrainian People's Republic, member of the Russian State Duma, one of founders of the Ukrainian Autocephalous Orthodox Church. He was brother of conductor and singer Oleksa Chupryna-Chekhivsky.

Biography

Early years
Chekhivsky was born on July 19, 1876 to the family of a clergyman in a village of Horokhuvatka, in the Kyivsky Uyezd of Kyiv Governorate (today in Obukhiv Raion). In 1900 he graduated from the Kyiv Theological Academy and the University of Odesa, from 1905 he was a Doctor of Theology. From 1897 he was a member of the student club of Mykhailo Drahomanov's Socialist-Democrats.

From 1901 to 1905 Cherkhivsky worked as Deputy Inspector of the seminaries of Kyiv and Kamianets-Podilskyi. Because of his activity and interest in Ukrainian nationalism at the seminaries, Chekhivsky was dismissed and transferred to the Cherkasy Oblast. From 1905 to 1906 he was a teacher of Russian language as well as of the History of Literature and the Theory of Philology at the Cherkassy Theology College.

Between 1902-1904 Chekhivsky was a member of the Revolutionary Ukrainian Party, after which he switched to the Ukrainian Social Democratic Labour Party (USDLP) until 1919. In 1906, he was elected to the Imperial Duma, however the Russian government exiled him, as a Ukrainian to Vologda in Russia. However, through the efforts of his electors to the Imperial Duma, he was returned from exile after one year.

From 1908 to 1917 Chekhivsky lived in Odesa where he taught in a gymnasium as well as commercial and technical colleges. During that time he was under open police surveillance. Nonetheless, Chekhivsky participated in the activities of a local Ukrainian Hromada and Prosvita association. Since 1915 he was a member of a masonic lodge "Star of the East" that existed in Odesa and was part of the Great East of Peoples of Russia.

Revolutionary years
After the February Revolution Chekhivsky became editor of the "Ukrayinske Slovo" newspaper that was published in Odesa. From April 1917 he headed the Odesa committee of the USDLP and the Ukrainian council of Odesa. From May 1917 Cherkhivsky was a district inspector of the Odesa School Council and headed the Odesa branch of All-Ukrainian Teachers Union. From June 1917 he was a deputy in the Odesa city duma from the Ukrainian parties, and headed the Kherson Governorate Council of united public organization.

In October–November 1917 Chekhivsky was a member of the Revolutionary committee (revkom). In November 1917 he became a political commissar of Odesa and an education commissar of the Kherson Governorate. At that time Chekhivsky was also elected to the Russian Constituent Assembly (from the Ukrainian Social-Democrats of Odesa). In the beginning of 1918 he became a member of Central Committee of the USDLP and from April 1918 — appointed as director of confessions as a minister in government of the Ukrainian People's Republic. Under the administration of Pavlo Skoropadskyi, Chekhivsky continued to work in the Ministry of Confessions (director of General Affairs department), yet continuing to be a member of the Ukrainian Social Democratic Labour Party. During that time he joined the Ukrainian National Union which was in opposition to the Hetman of Ukraine.

From Directorate to its opposition
Chekhivsky headed the Ukrainian revkom during the anti-Hetman uprising. From December 26, 1918 to February 11, 1919 Chekhivsky was President of the Council of People's Ministers and the Ministry of Foreign Affairs of the Ukrainian People's Republic. During that time was proclaimed the Unification Act of two Ukraines on January 22, 1919. On January 1, 1919 the government approved laws about the state language of Ukraine (Ukrainian) and about the autocephaly of Ukrainian Orthodox Church that were adopted  by the Directorate of Ukraine. On January 5, 1919 the government approved the Land law that was adopted by the Directorate on January 8.

Chekhivsky followed leftist political views, advocated compromise with Bolsheviks, opposed the treaty with Entente. On those issues his position was similar to the point of view of Volodymyr Vynnychenko. Chekhivsky had a little influence on the army of Ukraine. After failing to reach an agreement with Bolsheviks, successful offensive of the Red Army and willingness of the Ukrainian leadership to negotiate with French led to resignation of Chekhivsky in February 1919. After that was in opposition to the government of Symon Petliura. In spring of 1919 participated in organization of the Labor Congress of Ukraine in Kamianets-Podilskyi.

Cooperation with the Soviets and arrest
After the occupation by the Red Army Chekhivsky stayed in Ukraine and in 1920 joined the Ukrainian Communist Party. In October 1921 he participated in the 1st All-Ukrainian Church Assembly that confirmed autocephaly of the Ukrainian Autocephalous Orthodox Church (UAOC) and was an adviser to Metropolitan Vasyl Lypkivsky, organized pastoral courses in Kyiv. Chekhivsky was one of the main ideologists of the Ukrainian Church autocephaly and supporter of Christian socialism. In October 1927 he became a chairman of the 2nd All-Ukrainian Assembly of UAOC. During that time Chekhivsky also worked in the All-Ukrainian Academy of Sciences at its history-philology department, was a professor of medical and polytechnic institutes in Kiev, lectured at social-economical courses.

On July 29, 1929 Chekhivsky was arrested in connection with the Union for the Freedom of Ukraine process and on April 19, 1930 sentenced to death through shooting, changed to 10 years of imprisonment. He was confined to the Khabarovsk and Yaroslavl political prisons, from 1933 - in Solovki prison camp. In 1936 Chekhivsky was additionally sentenced to three years of imprisonment. On November 3, 1937 he was shot by sentence of the Leningrad Oblast NKVD troika.

Notes and references

External links
 Chekhivsky: statesman, chaplain, victim of the Sandromakh tract. Radio Liberty. 2012-06-02
 Chekhivsky, Volodymyr . Handbook on the History of Ukraine.
 Chekhivsky, Volodymyr. History of Poltava web-portal.

1876 births
1937 deaths
People from Kyiv Oblast
People from Kievsky Uyezd
Ukrainian people in the Russian Empire
Ukrainian Social Democratic Labour Party politicians
Ukrainian Communist Party politicians
Russian Constituent Assembly members
Prime ministers of the Ukrainian People's Republic
Foreign ministers of Ukraine
Ukrainian writers
Ukrainian educators
Ukrainian revolutionaries
Ukrainian diplomats
Ukrainian Christian socialists
Members of the Grand Orient of Russia's Peoples
Kiev Theological Academy alumni
Union for the Freedom of Ukraine trial
Great Purge victims from Ukraine
Soviet rehabilitations